Gaspar Voskanyan (January 22, 1887 – September 20, 1937) was an ethnic Armenian Soviet komkor (corps commander). He was born in what is now Grigoriopol District in Transnistria, Moldova. He fought in the Imperial Russian Army in World War I before going over to the Bolsheviks during the subsequent civil war. During the Great Purge, he was arrested on May 28, 1937, and later executed.

Awards
Russian Empire:
Order of St. George, 4th degree
Soviet Union:
Order of the Red Banner

References

1887 births
1937 deaths
People from Grigoriopol
People from Kherson Governorate
Russian military personnel of World War I
People of the Russian Civil War
Soviet komkors
Great Purge victims from Moldova
People executed by the Soviet Union
Recipients of the Order of the Red Banner
Moldovan people of Armenian descent
Armenian people from the Russian Empire